{{DISPLAYTITLE:C21H34O5}}
The molecular formula C21H34O5 may refer to:

 Betaenone A, a secondary metabolite isolated from the fungus Pleospora betae
 Betaenone C, a secondary metabolite isolated from the fungus Pleospora betae
 Tetrahydrocortisol, a steroid and an inactive metabolite of cortisol